Oberrieden is a municipality in the district of Horgen in the canton of Zurich in Switzerland. It is one of the towns along the south shore of Lake Zurich.

History
Oberrieden is first mentioned between 1133 and 1167 as Obrendrieden.

Geography
Of this area, 15.1% is used for agricultural purposes, while 42.8% is forested. Of the rest of the land, 40.6% is settled (buildings or roads) and the remainder (1.4%) is non-productive (rivers, glaciers or mountains).   housing and buildings made up 27.2% of the total area, while transportation infrastructure made up the rest (13.8%). Of the total unproductive area, water (streams and lakes) made up 0.7% of the area.   42.1% of the total municipal area was undergoing some type of construction.

The municipality is located on the left side of Zurich Lake.  It stretches from the Sihl to Zurich Lake.

Demographics
, 15.4% of the population was made up of foreign nationals.   the gender distribution of the population was 47.5% male and 52.5% female. Over the last 10 years the population has grown at a rate of 11.6%. Most of the population speaks German  (89.8%), with English being second most common ( 2.5%) and Italian being third ( 2.0%).

In the 2007 election the most popular party was the SVP which received 31.7% of the vote.  The next three most popular parties were the FDP (20%), the SPS (16.4%) and the CSP (11.7%).

The age distribution of the population is children and teenagers (0–19 years old) make up 20.1% of the population, while adults (20–64 years old) make up 62.4% and seniors (over 64 years old) make up 17.5%.  In Oberrieden about 88% of the population (between age 25–64) have completed either non-mandatory upper secondary education or additional higher education (either university or a Fachhochschule).  There are 2133 households in Oberrieden.

Oberrieden has an unemployment rate of 2%.  , there were 50 people employed in the primary economic sector and about 6 businesses involved in this sector.  69 people are employed in the secondary sector and there are 19 businesses in this sector.  569 people are employed in the tertiary sector, with 138 businesses in this sector.   69.2% of the working population were employed full-time, and 30.8% were employed part-time.

 there were 1460 Catholics and 2135 Protestants in Oberrieden. In the 2000 census, religion was broken down into several smaller categories. Of the rest of the population, 0% were Muslim, 3% belonged to another religion (not listed), 3.2% did not give a religion, and 14.3% were atheist or agnostic.

The historical population is given in the following table:

Transportation 
Oberrieden is on line S8, whilst Oberrieden Dorf is on line S24.
 
The Zimmerberg bus line (Zimmerbergbus), provided by the Sihltal Zürich Uetliberg Bahn (SZU), connects the Zimmerberg region and parts of the Sihl valley.

In the summer there are regular boats to Zurich as well as along the lake to Rapperswil, run by the Zürichsee-Schifffahrtsgesellschaft.

References

External links 

Official website of Oberrieden 

Municipalities of the canton of Zürich
Populated places on Lake Zurich